This is a list of defunct airlines of Ivory Coast.

See also

 List of airlines of Ivory Coast
 List of airports in Ivory Coast

References

Ivory Coast
Airlines
Airlines, defunct